Syllepte taiwanalis is a moth in the family Crambidae. It is found in Taiwan.

References

taiwanalis
Moths described in 1928
Moths of Taiwan